The 2022–23 North Florida Ospreys men's basketball team represented the University of North Florida in the 2022–23 NCAA Division I men's basketball season. The Ospreys, led by 14th-year head coach Matthew Driscoll, played their home games at the UNF Arena in Jacksonville, Florida as members of the ASUN Conference.

Previous season
The Ospreys finished the 2021–22 season 11–20, 7–9 in ASUN play to finish in fifth place in the East Division. In the ASUN tournament, they were defeated by Lipscomb in the first round.

Roster

Schedule and results

|-
!colspan=12 style=| Non-conference regular season

|-
!colspan=12 style=| ASUN regular season

|-
!colspan=12 style=| ASUN tournament

|-

Source

References

North Florida Ospreys men's basketball seasons
North Florida Ospreys
North Florida Ospreys men's basketball
North Florida Ospreys men's basketball